Glowing Mouth is the second studio album by American band Milagres. It was released on September 13, 2011 under Kill Rock Stars

Critical reception
Glowing Mouth was met with generally favorable reviews from critics. At Metacritic, which assigns a weighted average rating out of 100 to reviews from mainstream publications, this release received an average score of 62, based on 15 reviews.

Track listing

References

2011 albums
Milagres (band) albums
Kill Rock Stars albums